Judy Tegart-Dalton  (née Tegart; born 12 December 1937) is an Australian former professional tennis player. She won nine major doubles titles, and completed the career Grand Slam in women's doubles. Five of her doubles titles were with Margaret Court. Tegart was also a runner-up in 10 major doubles tournaments.

Career
Tegart reached the final at Wimbledon in 1968, where she lost to Billie Jean King in two tight sets after defeating second-seeded Court in the quarterfinal and third-seeded Nancy Richey in the semifinal. She also reached the singles semifinals at Wimbledon in 1971 at the age of 33, losing to Court in three sets, and at the Australian Championships in 1968, losing to King in three sets. Her last appearance at a Grand Slam tournament was the 1977 Australian Open, where at the age of 40 she lost in the quarterfinals in straight sets to top-seeded and eventual champion Evonne Goolagong Cawley.

Tegart won the singles, doubles and mixed doubles titles at the 1969 German Open Championships in Hamburg. In the singles final, she defeated Helga Niessen in straight sets.

Tegart was unusual in that she did not reach the quarterfinals of a Grand Slam singles tournament outside of Australia until she was 29 years of age. From Wimbledon in 1967 until the end of her career, she reached at least the quarterfinals in half of the Grand Slam singles tournaments she played (10 out of 20).

Tegart was a member of the Australian Federation Cup team in 1965, 1966, 1967, 1969, and 1970. Her career won-loss record was 18–4, including 6–1 in singles and 12–3 in doubles. Australia won the Federation Cup in 1965 and 1970.

Tegart was one of the original "Virginia Slims 9", the nine players who in 1971 joined the break-away Virginia Slims tour organised by Gladys Heldman. She married Dr. David Dalton on 18 November 1969.

She was made a Member of the Order of Australia (AM) in the 2019 Australia Day Honours for "significant service to tennis as a player, to equality for women in sport, and to sporting foundations".

Grand Slam finals

Singles: 1 final (1 runner-up)

Women's doubles: 11 finals (8 titles, 3 runners-up)

Mixed doubles: 8 finals (1 title, 7 runners-up)

Grand Slam singles tournament timeline

Note: The Australian Open was held twice in 1977, in January and December.  Dalton participated in both editions.

See also
 Performance timelines for all female tennis players who reached at least one Grand Slam final

References

External links
 
 
 

1937 births
Living people
Australian Championships (tennis) champions
Australian female tennis players
Australian Open (tennis) champions
French Championships (tennis) champions
Sportswomen from Victoria (Australia)
US Open (tennis) champions
Wimbledon champions
Grand Slam (tennis) champions in women's doubles
Grand Slam (tennis) champions in mixed doubles
Tennis players from Melbourne
Members of the Order of Australia
20th-century Australian women